The Disappeared are people believed to have been abducted, murdered and secretly buried in Northern Ireland, the large majority of which occurred during the Troubles. The Independent Commission for the Location of Victims' Remains (ICLVR) is in charge of locating the remaining bodies, and was led by forensic archaeologist John McIlwaine.

Background

Of the sixteen people investigated by the ICLVR, all were Irish Catholics (Jean McConville was a convert), all except Jean McConville were male, and all are believed to have been abducted and killed by Irish Republicans.

The Provisional IRA admitted to being involved in the forced disappearance of nine of the sixteen – Eamon Molloy, Seamus Wright, Kevin McKee, Jean McConville, Columba McVeigh, Brendan Megraw, John McClory, Brian McKinney, and Danny McIlhone. British Army officer Robert Nairac, who disappeared from South Armagh, was a Mauritius-born Roman Catholic. The organisation said they could only accurately locate the body of one of their victims, but gave rough ideas for the remaining eight. , the remains of three of the victims have still not been found.

History

1970s
Joseph Lynskey (40), a veteran Irish Republican paramilitary and IRA member from Cavendish Street in Belfast, disappeared during a violent internal IRA feud in the city in August 1972. In 2009 Dolours Price, a former IRA member, stated in an interview with a newspaper that she had driven him in a car out of Northern Ireland to an IRA safe house in County Monaghan in the Republic of Ireland (ROI) shortly before his disappearance. In January 2010 the IRA issued a statement that Lynskey had been killed by it as a part of an internal disciplinary process, and his body had subsequently been buried in an unmarked grave. In December 2014 a specialist team from the Garda Siochana was reported to be carrying out a search of an area of Coghalstown Bog in County Meath, ROI, for Lynskey's body.

Jean McConville, a widowed mother of 10, disappeared in December 1972. Her body was found on a beach in County Louth, ROI, in 2003; in October 2014 a man was arrested in connection with her murder, and two further men were arrested in December 2014.

Peter Wilson, 21, a native of West Belfast, with five siblings, was described as "a vulnerable man with learning difficulties". He was abducted by the IRA in the summer of 1973, somewhere in the St James area of Belfast, killed and secretly buried at Waterfoot, County Antrim.

Columba McVeigh, a 17-year-old from Donaghmore, County Tyrone, disappeared in 1975. The IRA allege he had confessed to being a British Army agent, instructed to infiltrate the IRA.

Brendan Megraw disappeared in 1978. In August 2014 a bog in County Meath was searched for his body, with human remains discovered in September.

Gerard Evans, 24, was a man from Crossmaglen, South Armagh, who disappeared while hitchhiking in County Monaghan in March 1979. In March 2008 a map was given to Evans' aunt. In 2008, the Independent Commission for the Location of Victims' Remains appealed for more information regarding his disappearance. Remains were found in County Louth in October 2010, which were later confirmed as being Evans' in November 2010. An alleged member of the Provisional IRA South Armagh Brigade told the Sunday Tribune that Evans was executed for being an informer.

1980s
Charles Armstrong was a 54-year-old father-of-five who went missing in Crossmaglen while walking to Mass in 1981; his car was later found in Dundalk, County Louth. The IRA denied any involvement in his disappearance at the time. Armstrong's family began a fresh, private search for his remains in October 2003. They were located in County Monaghan, Ireland in July 2010. No reason has ever been publicly given for Armstrong's abduction and murder.

2000s
In September 2015 the bodies of Seamus Wright and Kevin McKee were found in a bog in Coghalstown, County Meath.

In May 2017 a body was found in a forest in northern France identified as that of Seamus Ruddy.

There were two further disappearances in the 2000s. Gareth O'Connor, believed to have been a member of the Real IRA, disappeared while driving from Armagh to Dundalk in 2003. His body was discovered in Newry in 2005. In March 2005, Lisa Dorrian disappeared after attending a party at a caravan park in Ballyhalbert. She is believed to have been kidnapped by loyalists.

List of Disappeared

Disappearances since 1999

References

External links
 The Disappeared, bbc.co.uk

The Troubles (Northern Ireland)
People killed by the Provisional Irish Republican Army
Enforced disappearances in Northern Ireland
Deaths by firearm in the Republic of Ireland
Irish murder victims
Irish victims of crime
Murder victims from Northern Ireland
People murdered in Northern Ireland
Kidnapped people from Northern Ireland
Deaths by firearm in Northern Ireland
Terrorism deaths in Northern Ireland
Kidnapped Irish people
People murdered in the Republic of Ireland
Terrorism deaths in the Republic of Ireland
Provisional Irish Republican Army